Arnold Mortier (1843 – 2 January 1885) was a 19th-century French journalist, playwright, and librettist.

Arnold Mortier was responsible for the drama column at Le Figaro, gathered in a collection entitled Les soirées parisiennes de 18NN par un Monsieur de l'orchestre.

Mortier cosigned the libretto of the opéra-bouffe Le Docteur Ox by Jacques Offenbach, created in 1877.

He also participated to the writing of the following:
 Le voyage dans la lune, opéra-féerie in four acts and 23 scenes by Jacques Offenbach (1875)
 L'arbre de Noël (with Georges Jacobi) (1880)

Works 
 Arnold Mortier, Les Soirées parisiennes de 18NN : par un Monsieur de l'orchestre, Paris, E. Dentu, 1875-1885 Read online, on Gallica.

References

External links 
 Arnold Mortier on 
 Arnold Mortier on Wikisource
 Les soirées parisiennes de [1874-] 1884

19th-century French journalists
French male journalists
19th-century French dramatists and playwrights
French opera librettists
1843 births
1885 deaths
19th-century French male writers